Ardagh is a barony in County Longford, Republic of Ireland.

Etymology
Ardagh barony derives its name from the village of Ardagh, County Longford (from Árd-achadh, "high pasture").

Location

Ardagh barony is located in eastern County Longford.

History
In Early Christian times Ardagh was the centre of Tethbae Deiscirt (South Tethbae). Ardagh barony was formed from the territory of Sleughtwilliam (Edgeworthstown), the territory of Clangillernan (Templemichael), and from part of the church lands in the parishes of Ardagh and Ballymacormick.

List of settlements

Below is a list of settlements in Ardagh barony:
Ardagh
Edgeworthstown (Mostrim)
Lisryan
Longford

References

Baronies of County Longford